Alex de Angelis (born 26 February 1984) is a Sammarinese retired motorcycle road racer.

Career

125cc World Championship
Born in Rimini, de Angelis made his debut at world championship level in 1999 in the 125 cc class; his first full season was in 2000, when his best results were two sixth places. He rode a total of four full seasons in the 125cc category. His best season in the 125 class came in 2003 when he claimed six podium finishes and finished second to Dani Pedrosa, despite not recording any wins.

250cc World Championship
He moved to the 250cc category in 2004, when he scored two podiums and was fifth overall. Next year he had four podiums and was seventh overall. 2006 turned out to be real breakthrough, as he finished third in the championship. He took his first victory at the season finale in Valencia, after 9 second and 14 third places and 8 pole-positions beforehand. In 2007 he finished 3rd overall with 235 points and eight podiums, including four successive second places midseason. He finished on the podium at the Sachsenring every year between 2002 and 2007.

MotoGP World Championship

For 2008 he moved to the MotoGP class, riding for Gresini Honda. At Mugello he was fastest in the warmup, and impressed on race day to finish 4th. He also came fourth at the Sachsenring, and consistently scored minor points for the rest of the season. He stayed at Gresini for 2009 after an impressive rookie year. However, he left the team for 2010 as he and his teammate Toni Elías were replaced with Marco Melandri and Marco Simoncelli. Instead, he signed a deal to partner Niccolò Canepa at Team Scot in the first season of the new Moto2 class.

Return to Moto2
After replacing the injured Hiroshi Aoyama for three races in MotoGP, de Angelis returned to Moto2 at the San Marino Grand Prix in Misano. During this race he was involved in an accident which resulted in the death of Japanese rider Shoya Tomizawa. After Tomizawa fell from his bike on the twelfth lap of the race, he was immediately hit by de Angelis and Scott Redding, who were unable to avoid him. De Angelis avoided major injury and was able to walk away from the accident.

Return to MotoGP
De Angelis moved back to the premier class to replace Colin Edwards in the Forward team midway through the 2014 season from the Brno round onwards when Edwards retired from MotoGP racing. For the 2015 season, de Angelis replaced Danilo Petrucci at the Octo IodaRacing Team.

Career statistics

Grand Prix motorcycle racing

By season

By class

Races by year
(key) (Races in bold indicate pole position, races in italics indicate fastest lap)

Superbike World Championship

Races by year
(key) (Races in bold indicate pole position, races in italics indicate fastest lap)

References

External links

  

1984 births
Living people
Sammarinese motorcycle racers
Italian motorcycle racers
Italian people of Sammarinese descent
Pramac Racing MotoGP riders
250cc World Championship riders
125cc World Championship riders
Moto2 World Championship riders
Superbike World Championship riders
Sportspeople from Rimini
Gresini Racing MotoGP riders
MotoGP World Championship riders
MotoE World Cup riders